Ingri Aunet Tyldum (born 14 October 1983 in Overhalla) is a Norwegian cross-country skier who has competed since 2002. Her best World Cup finish was eighth in a sprint event in Sweden in 2008.

Cross-country skiing results
All results are sourced from the International Ski Federation (FIS).

World Cup

Season standings

Team podiums

 1 victory 
 1 podium

References

External links

1983 births
Living people
Norwegian female cross-country skiers
People from Overhalla
Sportspeople from Trøndelag